The men's 110 metres hurdles event at the 2007 Pan American Games was held on July 27–28.

Medalists

Results

Heats
Qualification: First 2 of each heat (Q) and the next 2 fastest (q) qualified for the final.

Wind:Heat 1: +0.1 m/s, Heat 2: -0.2 m/s, Heat 3: +0.4 m/s

Final
Wind: +0.4 m/s

References
Official results

110
2007